{{DISPLAYTITLE:C10H10O5}}
The molecular formula C10H10O5 (molar mass: 210.18 g/mol) may refer to:

 2,4-Diacetylphloroglucinol
 2-Hydroxyethyl terephthalic acid
 5-Hydroxyferulic acid, a hydroxycinnamic acid